The ellagitannins are a diverse class of hydrolyzable tannins, a type of polyphenol formed primarily from the oxidative linkage of galloyl groups in 1,2,3,4,6-pentagalloyl glucose. Ellagitannins differ from gallotannins, in that their galloyl groups are linked through C-C bonds, whereas the galloyl groups in gallotannins are linked by depside bonds.

Ellagitannins contain various numbers of hexahydroxydiphenoyl units, as well as galloyl units and/or sanguisorboyl units bounded to sugar moiety. In order to determine the quantity of every individual unit, the hydrolysis of the extracts with trifluoroacetic acid in methanol/water system is performed. Hexahydroxydiphenic acid, created after hydrolysis, spontaneously lactonized to ellagic acid, and sanguisorbic acid to sanguisorbic acid dilactone, while gallic acid remains intact.

Ellagitannins generally form macrocycles, whereas gallotannins do not.

Examples 
 Castalagin 
 Castalin 
 Casuarictin
 Grandinin 
 Oenothein B from Willowherbs (Epilobium spp.)
 Roburin A    
 Tellimagrandin II 
 Terflavin B
 Vescalagin
 Pomegranate ellagitannins, many compounds
 Punicalagin
 Punicalin

Metabolism

Degradation 
Urolithins, such as urolithin A, are microflora human metabolites of dietary ellagic acid derivatives.

Natural occurrences 
Ellagitannins are reported in dicotyledoneous angiospermes, and notably in species in the order Myrtales, such as the pomegranate.

See also 
 Urolithin - Urolithin A
 Polyphenols
 List of antioxidants in food

References

Further reading 
 Quideau, Stéphane (editor). Chemistry and Biology of Ellagitannins: An Underestimated Class of Bioactive Plant Polyphenols, 2009, World Scientific Publishing.    Table of Contents.  Preface.   Chapter 1.

External links 
  Tannin Chemistry (Tannin Handbook, Copyright 1998, 2002, 2011,  Ann E. Hagerman)

Aromatase inhibitors